Riscle (Gascon: Riscla) is a commune in the Gers department in southwestern France. On 1 January 2019, the former commune Cannet was merged into Riscle.

Geography

Population

See also
 Communes of the Gers department

References

Communes of Gers